A timeline of the Holocaust in Norway is detailed in the events listed below.

Sources
 Abrahamsen, Samuel. Norway's Response to the Holocaust: A Historical Perspective. Holocaust Library (1991). .

References

The Holocaust in Norway
Norwegian timelines
The Holocaust-related lists